Giant frog may refer to:
 Blyth's river frog (Limnonectes blythii), a frog in the family Dicroglossidae found from Myanmar through western Thailand and the Malay Peninsula (Malaysia, Singapore) to Sumatra and Borneo (Indonesia)
 Cyclorana australis, also known as the northern snapping frog, a burrowing frog in the family Hylidae native to Australia
 Goliath frog (Conraua goliath), a frog in the family Conrauidae, the world's largest frog, native to Cameroon and Equatorial Guinea